Robert Sharon Allen (July 14, 1900 — February 23, 1981) was an American journalist, Washington bureau chief for The Christian Science Monitor, and military officer.

Background
Robert Sharon Allen was born on July 14, 1900, in Latonia, Kentucky to Harry and Lizzie (Elizabeth) Greenberg. Robert's given name was Herman Greenberg. He changed his name and lied about his age in order to join the military on September 6, 1916. His father officially changed his name to match his son's in 1918, saying that there was a German "taint" to the last part of his name and he desired a real American name. After that time all the family except his brother Isador used the name.

Allen married fellow journalist Ruth Finney in 1929, and they remained married until her death in 1979. He later married Adeline Sunday (1921–2017), his former secretary.

Career
Allen joined the army, lying about his age in order to do so, and served in the cavalry during the Pancho Villa Expedition of 1916–17 and in France during World War I.

After the war, he graduated from the University of Wisconsin and took up reporting.  He joined the Ku Klux Klan in order to write an exposé about them, and was studying in Munich at the time of Hitler's Beer Hall Putsch (1923).  It was at this time he became a foreign correspondent for the Christian Science Monitor.

In 1931, Allen was the Washington bureau chief for the Christian Science Monitor.  Because the magazine would not publish content critical of Herbert Hoover, Allen and Drew Pearson anonymously co-wrote the book Washington Merry-Go-Round, an exposé of the Hoover administration.  After Hoover tracked down their identities, both authors were fired.  In 1932 the two journalists published a sequel, More Merry-Go-Round, and wrote a nationally syndicated column titled "Merry-Go-Round".

In 1933, Allen worked as a Soviet agent (Sh/147) for $100 a month.  According to John Earl Haynes, Harvey Klehr and Alexander Vassiliev in their 2009 book Spies: The Rise and Fall of the KGB in America, this was legal for Allen to do, being prior to the passage of the 1938 Foreign Agents Registration Act, and his motivation is unknown.

In 1937, during the court-packing controversy, Allen and Pearson co-authored the book The Nine Old Men, about the U.S. Supreme Court. During the early forties he co-wrote the newspaper strip Hap Hopper with Drew Pearson. The strip was drawn by Jack Sparling.

He served on General Patton's staff in World War II, reaching the rank of colonel. During a reconnaissance mission, Allen lost his right arm in combat fire. His wartime diary would be published after his death.

In 1947, he edited the book Our Fair City, an exposé of corrupt conditions in American municipalities. He also wrote Lucky Forward: The History of Patton's Third Army. Papers concerning his military career reside in the George S. Patton Museum at Fort Knox, Kentucky.

According to documents released by the CIA in 2007, Allen was the subject of a wiretap operation, Project Mockingbird. Associated Press reported:  "Under pressure from Attorney General Robert F. Kennedy" in 1962, CIA director John McCone "agreed to tap the telephones of columnists Robert S. Allen and Paul Scott in an effort to identify their sources for classified information which was appearing in their columns," says a memo a decade later to the agency's director."

Death
Allen died from a self-inflicted gunshot wound at his home in Georgetown on February 23, 1981, at age 80. He also had cancer at the time of his death, and the effects of the disease had forced him to retire the year prior.

References

1900 births
1981 deaths
1981 suicides
20th-century American journalists
American male journalists
20th-century American non-fiction writers
American columnists
American spies for the Soviet Union
Burials at Arlington National Cemetery
The Christian Science Monitor people
Journalists from Kentucky
Journalists from Washington, D.C.
Military personnel from Kentucky
People from Georgetown (Washington, D.C.)
People from Kenton County, Kentucky
Recipients of the Legion of Merit
Recipients of the Silver Star
Suicides by firearm in Washington, D.C.
United States Army colonels
United States Army personnel of World War II
United States Army personnel of World War I
United States Army reservists
University of Wisconsin–Madison alumni
20th-century American male writers